Patrick Caldwell may refer to:

 Patrick C. Caldwell (1801–1855), U.S. Representative from South Carolina
 Patrick Caldwell (skier) (born 1994), American cross-country skier